A Tailor-Made Man is a 1917 American play by Harry James Smith, which ran for 398 performances at the Cohan and Harris Theatre. It debuted on August 27, 1917, and played through August 1918.

The play was adapted from the 1908 Hungarian play A Szerencse Fia ("Son of Luck") by Gábor Drégely. The Playbill and press referred to Dregely's play as The Well-Fitting Dress Coat, which derives from the play's German title (Der gutsitzende Frack), so presumably Smith worked from that translation. 

Grant Mitchell starred in the 1917 Broadway production, which was staged by Sam Forrest, and in an October 1929 revival. The play ran for just shy of an entire year at the Cohan and Harris Theatre in New York. The play was Smith's greatest success, but he did not live to see the full run, as he died in a train and automobile accident in March 1918 while working for the Red Cross.

The play later led to a 1922 silent film and 1931 film.

Original Broadway cast
(In order of appearance)
Mr. Huber ... Gus Weinberg
Mr. Rowlands ... L.E. Conness
Peter ... Barlowe Borland
Dr. Gustavus Sonntag ... Theodore Friebus
Tanya Huber ... Helen MacKellar
John Paul Bart ... Grant Mitchell
Pomeroy ... Rowland Buckstone
Mrs. Stanlaw ... Minna Gale Haynes
Mr. Stanlaw ... Harry Harwood
Corinne Stanlaw ... Mona Kingsley
Dorothy ... Adrienne Bonnelli
Bobby Westlake ... Lloyd Carpenter
Mr. Fleming ... John Wall
Mr. Crane ... John Maccabee
Mr. Carroll ... Douglas Farne
Mrs. Fitzmorris ... Josephine Deffry
Wheating ... Frank G. Harley
Mrs. Kittie Dupuy ... Lotta Linthicum
Bessie Dupuy ... Nancy Power
Mr. Jellicott ... A.P. Kaye
Abraham Nathan ... Frank Burbeck
Miss Shayne ... Gladys Gilbert
Mr. Grayson ... Leonard White
Mr. Whitcombe ... Howard Wall
Mr. Russell (labor delegate) ... John A. Boone
Mr. Cain (labor delegate) ... J.H. Greene
Mr. Flynn (labor delegate) ... William C. Hodges

References

External links

 
 A Tailor-Made Man: A Comedy in Four Acts (full play via Google books, published 1919)

Broadway plays
1917 plays